is a Japanese variety program that has been broadcast on NHK General Television since April 13, 2018. The program won the Entertainment Division Grand Prize in the 22nd Japan Media Arts Festival in 2019.

Overview 
Virtual five-year-old know-it-all Chico (girl) poses various questions to Takashi Okamura (comedian) and the guests. If a guest cannot answer her question, Chico scolds them “Don’t sleep through life!”. This catchphrase was even nominated for the 2018 U-Can New Words and Buzzword Awards.

Cast 
 Chico (Yūichi Kimura)
 Takashi Okamura
 Ai Tsukahara
 Miyuki Morita
 Kyoe

References

External links 
 チコちゃんに叱られる! - NHK
 チコちゃんに叱られる！ - NHK放送史（動画・記事）
 Chico Will Scold You! - JAPAN MEDIA ARTS FESTIVAL

2018 Japanese television series debuts
2010s Japanese television series
2020s Japanese television series
Japanese variety television shows
Japanese game shows
NHK original programming